Bob Duckworth is an American politician.

Bob Duckworth may also refer to:
Bobby Duckworth (born 1958), American football player
Robert Duckworth  (1870–1924), English footballer
Bob Duckworth (speedway rider) (born 1929), New Zealand speedway rider